Dolbina inexacta, the common grizzled hawkmoth, is a species of moth of the family Sphingidae.

Distribution 
It is found from Pakistan, northern and central India and Nepal across Myanmar, southern China, northern Thailand and northern Vietnam to Taiwan.

Description 
The wingspan is 55–86 mm. The thorax, legs and wings undersides are brown. There are large black mesial patches on the abdomen underside. The discal interspace on the forewing upperside is sometimes pinkish grey between the discal cell and the hind margin.

Biology 
The larvae have been recorded feeding on Ligustrum robustum in China and Olea, Lonicera, Ligustrum, Fraxinus and Osmanthus species elsewhere.

References

Dolbina
Moths described in 1856
Moths of Japan